Hoàng Tấn Tài (born March 30, 1990) is a Vietnamese male weightlifter, competing in the 85 kg category and representing Vietnam at international competitions. He participated in the men's 85 kg event  at the 2015 World Weightlifting Championships, and at the 2016 Summer Olympics, finishing in seventeenth position.

Major results

References

External links
 

1990 births
Living people
Vietnamese male weightlifters
Place of birth missing (living people)
Weightlifters at the 2016 Summer Olympics
Olympic weightlifters of Vietnam
Southeast Asian Games bronze medalists for Vietnam
Southeast Asian Games medalists in weightlifting
Competitors at the 2017 Southeast Asian Games
21st-century Vietnamese people